Ruffles (known as Lays Maxx or Lays Max in some countries and Walkers Max, Walkers Max Double Crunch or Walkers Max Strong for the UK and Ireland markets) is an American brand of  ruffled (crinkle-cut) potato chips. The Frito Company acquired the rights to Ruffles brand potato chips in 1958 from its creator, Bernhardt Stahmer, who had adopted the trademark in 1948. and later merged with H.W. Lay & Co. in 1961. The Ruffle name has been used as Ruffles Lays when the product was introduced for the first time in India in 1995 to late 90s.

The product is named as an analogy to the ruffle, a strip of fabric sometimes gathered, creating folds.

Flavors 
Ruffles are produced in a variety of flavors and presentations in addition to traditional, some of these variants are produced exclusively for regional markets, the existing varieties include: sour cream & onion, cheddar & sour cream, cheese, barbecue, salt & vinegar, cream cheese, and hot wings.

In Canada, a unique flavour of Ruffles known as All-Dressed is also the most popular flavour in the country. All-Dressed is a mix of ketchup, barbecue, and salt & vinegar flavours.

In Mexico it has already been sold in the flavors of jamón, buffalo salsa, chile con queso, tomato salsa, bacon and lime. In Brazil it has an exclusive flavor: onion and parsley, but it also has other limited flavors like yakisoba, stroganoff, honey mustard, pepperoni, feijoada, burritos, ribs, pizza and lime.

Marketing 
In 2013 a mascot was introduced in Brazil in the Ruffles commercials: a potato with pants and sunglasses called Batatito that at first appeared in commercials aimed at the adult audience. The character was also used in commercials throughout the rest of Latin America. Batatito's last appearance was in 2017 appearing in a commercial for the lime flavor appearing alongside the Pepsi Twist mascots, and also being the only time he appeared on the packaging.

See also 
 McCoy's (similar UK product)
 Seabrook (similar UK product)
 Chitato (similar product)
 List of brand name snack foods

References

External links 
 

Brand name potato chips and crisps
Brand name snack foods
Frito-Lay brands
Products introduced in 1948